Frédéric E. Sautet (born in 1968), is a French economist. He currently teaches economics in the United States.

Biography 
After studying at the Institut d’études politiques de Paris, Sautet received his doctorate in economics from the University of Paris (advisor: Pascal Salin). He pursued his postdoctoral studies at New York University under the auspices of Peter Boettke, Israel Kirzner and Mario Rizzo.

He has lecturered at the University of Paris, New York University, George Mason University, and is teaching at the Catholic University of America where he is the cofounder of the Ciocca Center for Principled Entrepreneurship and academic director of the entrepreneurship program.

Work and publications 
Sautet’s research comprises entrepreneurship theory and the market process, cluster theory, economic development, and institutional economics. He is the co-editor with Peter Boettke of the Collected Works of Israel Kirzner in ten volumes published by Liberty Fund.

References

External links
Sautet's bio at the Catholic University of America School of Business and Economics

Austrian School economists
1968 births
French economists
Living people
French classical liberals